Dammers is a surname.  People with the name include:

 Elly Dammers, Dutch javelin thrower
 Hans Dammers (1913–1944), German World War II fighter ace
 Horace Dammers, English religious leader and writer
 Jerry Dammers (born 1955), English musician

See also
 Dahmer (disambiguation)
 Dammer (disambiguation)